Kopernica is a village and municipality in Žiar nad Hronom District in the Banská Bystrica Region of central Slovakia.

Etymology
The name comes from koper (Slovak koper, kôpor: dill) + -nica. "The land where the wild dill grows".

History
The village belonged to a German language island, known as Hauerland. The German population was expelled in 1945. 

In 1990, Poor Clares returned to the village and established a new monastery in the municipality.

Notabler personalities
 Jozef Pribilinec (born 1960), track and field athlete, racewalker

See also
 List of municipalities and towns in Slovakia

References

External links
Surnames of living people in Kopernica

Villages and municipalities in Žiar nad Hronom District